Krisztina Barta (born 9 May 1991 in Budapest) is a Hungarian former competitive ice dancer. With Ádám Tóth, she is the 2008 Hungarian national champion and competed in the final segment at three ISU Championships – the 2006 World Junior Championships in Ljubljana, Slovenia; 2007 World Junior Championships in Oberstdorf, Germany; and 2008 European Championships in Zagreb, Croatia. They also competed in the original dance at the 2008 World Championships in Gothenburg, Sweden.

Programs 
(with Tóth)

Results 
JGP: Junior Grand Prix

with Tóth

References

External links

Navigation

Hungarian female ice dancers
1991 births
Figure skaters from Budapest
Living people